Entada rheedii, commonly known as African dream herb or snuff box sea bean, and as the cacoon vine in Jamaica, is a large woody liana or climber of the Mimosa Family (Mimosaceae). The vine can grow as long as 120 meters (393.7 feet). Their seeds have a thick and durable seed coat which allows them to survive lengthy periods of immersion in seawater.

Naming
Though its scientific name was first published as E. rheedii, it is often written as Entada rheedei, honouring Hendrik Adriaan van Rheede tot Draakestein (1637–1691).

Subspecies
The following subspecies have been used:
  Entada rheedii rheedii
  Entada rheedii sinohimalensis (Grierson & D.G.Long) Panigrahi

Traditional use
The species is employed in African traditional medicine to induce vivid dreams, enabling communication with the spirit world. The inner meat of the seed would be either consumed directly, or the meat would be chopped, dried, mixed with other herbs like tobacco and smoked just before sleep to induce the desired dreams.

The plant is also used as a topical ointment against jaundice, toothache, ulcers and to treat muscular-skeletal problems. The seeds are sought after as pieces of jewelry and as good-luck charms.

The 1889 book The Useful Native Plants of Australia records that Entada Scandens has the common names included "Queensland Bean". Indigenous Australians of the Cleveland Bay area referred to the plant as "Barbaddah" and that "These large beans are ... put into the stone oven and heated in the same way and for the same time as those of Avicennia tomentosa (q.v.); they are then pounded fine and put into a dilly-bag, and left for ten or twelve hours in water, then they are fit for use." (Murrell's testimony). The natives of India also eat them after roasting and soaking in water."

Distribution and habitat
Its seeds are found on east and southern African beaches, having grown on river and estuary banks and in swamp forest. As a result of its ready dispersal by sea, Entada rheedii is widely distributed in tropical and subtropical areas (excluding the Americas): tropical Africa, South Africa, tropical Asia and Queensland.

Gallery

References

Entheogens
rheedii
Flora of Africa
Flora of tropical Asia
Flora of Queensland
Garden plants
Decorative fruits and seeds
Plants used in traditional African medicine
Oneirogens
Bushfood
Fabales of Asia